Isfahan international convention center  (officially the Imam Khamenei international convention center, after Iranian supreme leader Ali Khamenei) is a convention center under construction in Isfahan, Iran.

The main hall has a capacity of 2354 people, with offices, a cinema, and parking. It is attached to a 12 floor hotel and 8 VIP villas.

Construction as of 2020 January was 80% complete, with 670 billion tomans in cost.

Further reading
 Imam Khamenei Intl Conference Hall, Islamic-Iranian architecture

See also
Isfahan Exhibition

References

External links 
 https://isf-icc.ir
 http://wikimapia.org/29258141/Summit-Halls-Complex
video

Isfahan